R. K. (Radha Krishna) is a former Indian actor who appears in Tamil films. He was a prominent businessman before he broke into films, owning a real estate business called "Velcome City".

Career
After portraying small roles in films like Villu Pattukaran (1992), Poi (2006) and Thoondil (2008), he made his debut as lead actor with Ellam Avan Seyal (2008), remake of Malayalam movie titled Chintamani Kola Case. The film received mixed reviews from critics and emerged as average grosser. He went on to do lead roles in films like Azhagar Malai (2009), En Vazhi Thani Vazhi (2014) and Vaigai Express (2017) which did not do well at box-office and in-between he also portrayed negative roles in films like Avan Ivan (2011), Jilla (2014) a guest appearance and Paayum Puli (2015).

Films acted

References

Male actors in Tamil cinema
Tamil male actors
Living people
People from Sivaganga district
Male actors from Tamil Nadu
20th-century Indian male actors
1959 births